"Shadows" is the sixth episode of the first season of the American science fiction television series The X-Files, premiering on the Fox network on October 22, 1993. It was written by Glen Morgan and James Wong, directed by Michael Katleman, and featured guest appearances by Barry Primus and Lisa Waltz. The episode is a "Monster-of-the-Week" story, unconnected to the series' wider mythology. "Shadows" earned a Nielsen household rating of 5.9, being watched by 5.6 million households in its initial broadcast. The episode was not well-received by the production staff and received mixed reviews from critics.

The show centers on FBI agents Fox Mulder (David Duchovny) and Dana Scully (Gillian Anderson) who work on cases linked to the paranormal, called X-Files. In this episode, Mulder and Scully investigate the death of two muggers and encounter an office worker who may be haunted by the spirit of her dead boss, who is using her to uncover his murderer; and discover covert arms deals made with Middle Eastern radicals.

This episode, inspired by the 1982 horror film The Entity, was written due to insistence that the creators write more episodes where Mulder and Scully help people. This allowed the writers some space to create other episodes they had in mind.

Plot 
Two muggers are found dead in a back alley of Philadelphia after robbing a woman, Lauren Kyte, at an automated teller machine. FBI agents Fox Mulder (David Duchovny) and Dana Scully (Gillian Anderson) investigate the case when called in by a pair of agents from an unknown agency. The bodies are found to have an electrical charge and their throats have been crushed from the inside. Meanwhile, Lauren sees her boss, Robert Dorlund, and resigns due to her grief over the death of Dorlund's partner, Howard Graves, who supposedly committed suicide weeks before.

Mulder and Scully determine that one of the dead muggers belonged to an Islamic terrorist group, the Isfahan, and using the ATM video are able to track down Lauren. A screenshot of the video reveals a blurry figure who appears to be Howard Graves. When the agents meet with Lauren at her home, she reluctantly admits to the incident but knows nothing about the murders. Upon leaving, the agents find their car going out of control on its own, leading it to crash into another car. At a repair shop, the car is found to have no evidence of tampering, but an electrical charge is detected within it.

Upon visiting Graves' headstone, the agents learn of his purported suicide and the death of his daughter at a young age, who would have been Lauren's age were she still alive. Scully suspects that Graves faked his death, but on consulting the pathologist who examined his body and testing the organs he donated to others, it is proved that he is really dead. Meanwhile, Lauren witnesses a vision at night, including blood appearing in the bathtub, that leads her to believe that Graves was murdered. At her going-away party, Lauren is threatened by Dorlund, who believes she has knowledge of confidential information that could implicate him. Lauren calls the agents to her home, but before they can get there two assassins hired by Dorlund arrive to kill her. An invisible force kills both of them just as Mulder and Scully arrive (with Mulder witnessing the body of one assassin floating in midair).

Lauren is interrogated by Mulder, Scully, and the two unknown agents, who believe Graves and Dorlund's company sold technology to the Isfahan. Lauren admits to Mulder and Scully that the sales did indeed take place and that she believes Dorlund had Graves killed. After hearing Lauren recount the eerie circumstances that she believes are being caused by Graves' spirit, Scully—the usually reserved skeptic—readily accepts her story. Mulder is confused but, after Lauren leaves, Scully admits she was just humoring her. The agents search the company's premises, but are unable to find any evidence. When Dorlund attacks Lauren with a letter opener, Graves' spirit takes it and cuts open the wallpaper, revealing a disc with evidence. Weeks later, Lauren starts her new job, but it is implied that Graves' spirit may have followed her there.

Production 
This episode was created on the Fox network's insistence that the creators write more episodes where Mulder and Scully help people. This episode was written to accomplish that, and to allow the writers some space to create other episodes they had in mind. Co-writer Glen Morgan claims the episode was inspired by the movie The Entity. The name Tom Braidwood, the show's assistant director who later played Lone Gunmen member Melvin Frohike, is used in the scene where a parking lot attendant paints over the name of Howard Graves. The episode featured guest appearances by Barry Primus, Lisa Waltz, Lorena Gale and Veena Sood.

Fox emphasized the horror aspect of "Shadows" by using the tagline "Don't watch it alone" when advertising the episode. During the episode, Mulder jokes that Elvis was the only man ever to have successfully faked his own death. The joke would eventually become the first of many similar Elvis jokes littered throughout most of the series. When Mulder wonders whether or not it could have been a poltergeist, Scully mocks him by replying "they're here", a tagline and famous quote from the film Poltergeist (1982).

Broadcast and reception 

"Shadows" premiered on Fox on October 22, 1993, and was first broadcast in the United Kingdom on BBC Two on October 24, 1994. The episode earned a Nielsen household rating of 5.9 with an 11 share—meaning that in the US, 5.9 percent of television-equipped households, and 11 percent of all households actively watching television, were watching the program. It was viewed by 5.6 million households.

In a retrospective of the first season in Entertainment Weekly, "Shadows" was rated a C+, with the episode being called "exceedingly awkward", while the political context was seen as a weak point. Keith Phipps, writing for The A.V. Club, had mixed feeling about the episode, rating it a C+. He felt that the episode's plot worked well, though the supernatural elements seemed "a little corny". Matt Haigh, writing for Den of Geek, was more positive about the episode, calling it "fun viewing" and feeling that "with characters we could care about and a far more rounded plot, this proved one of the better episodes so far. I still wouldn’t call it a particularly brilliant one, though, either".

Co-writer James Wong felt that the changes he was asked to make to the script led to "Shadows" turning out to be "an average episode", although he felt "the director did a good job with it". His partner Glen Morgan had a similar opinion, calling it "a little too ordinary, like you have seen it before, which is exactly what the network wanted at the time. Chris Carter had a more positive view of the episode, calling it "very well done, really great effects, and more of a meat-and-potatoes kind of story. An FBI sting and a good mystery that Mulder and Scully investigate. Overall, a really solid episode." The plot for "Shadows" was also adapted as a novel for young adults in 2000 by Ellen Steiber, under the title Haunted.

Footnotes

References

External links 

 "Shadows" on The X-Files official website
 

1993 American television episodes
Television episodes about ghosts
Television episodes set in Nebraska
Television episodes set in Philadelphia
The X-Files (season 1) episodes

it:Episodi di X-Files (prima stagione)#Come un’ombra